The Tenpohzan Grand Prix Championship is a title contested in the Japanese pro wrestling promotion Osaka Pro Wrestling. The title was established when Miracle Man became the first champion.

Being a professional wrestling championship, it is not won via direct competition; it is instead won via a predetermined ending to a match or awarded to a wrestler because of a wrestling angle.  There have been three reigns by three wrestlers with one vacancies. The vacancy came when Miracle Man didn't defend the title.

Title history

List of combined reigns

References

External links

Osaka Pro Wrestling championships